The eighth and final season of Weeds premiered on July 1, 2012, on the television cable network Showtime, and featured 13 episodes, bringing the series total to 102. It marks the return of the show's theme song, "Little Boxes". Creator Jenji Kohan revealed that cover versions of the song would be used during the opening credits (as during past seasons) and confirmed that Ben Folds and the Mountain Goats would be featured artists. Kohan also confirmed that the song would be covered in a duet by Steve Martin and series regular Kevin Nealon, who each sang and played the banjo. Series co-star Hunter Parrish also provided a cover version for the season's tenth episode.  The final two episodes of the season aired back to back as a one-hour series finale, which was the series' first and only one-hour show in its eight-year run.

Plot 
Season eight picks up where season seven ended — the family is eating dinner when a concealed sniper targets Nancy through a rifle scope and fires a shot. Nancy, shot in the head, is rushed to the hospital. While she is still unconscious, the shooter, Tim Scottson, son of her late second husband, DEA agent Peter Scottson, visits her. Shane, first a member of the police academy and later an officer, arrests him with his police squad. Nancy's estranged sister Jill sleeps with both Nancy's brother-in-law Andy and Doug. Subsequently, Jill claims to be pregnant but lies and is really going through menopause. 

Nancy begins working as a representative at a pharmaceutical company which legally produces medical marijuana for people diagnosed with cancer undergoing radiation therapy. Silas also gets a job growing marijuana at the same company as Nancy.
After Silas starts working at the pharmaceutical company, he finds  himself not too pleased with the process his plants have to go through after they are selected. This leads him to contemplate what marijuana really means to him.

After much debate and deliberation, Nancy and Silas realize the industry in which they belong. This realization has them back in Regrestic (formerly Agrestic and Majestic, where the story began). Teaming up with past friends (and enemies) Nancy develops a scheme.  

The series finale jumps several years into the future and shows how the lives of the characters have progressed. Marijuana was legalized at an unspecified time during the time jump and as a result the Botwins are running several successful marijuana businesses. Per usual, the series gives a slightly dark twist on the present lives of the characters.  Nancy regrets her past, but knows there is nothing she can do to change it.  Doug on the other hand, wants to reconcile his past mistakes.  In the end, the main characters are huddled together, pondering and reflecting, while enjoying the product that has often caused them so much turmoil and yet made them closer and more appreciative of the unique bond they share.

Cast

Main cast 
Mary-Louise Parker as Nancy Botwin (13 episodes)
Hunter Parrish as Silas Botwin (13 episodes)
Alexander Gould as Shane Botwin (13 episodes)
Justin Kirk as Andy Botwin (12 episodes)
Kevin Nealon as Doug Wilson (13 episodes)

Special guest stars 
Jennifer Jason Leigh as Jill Price-Grey (8 episodes)
Pablo Schreiber as Demetri Ravitch (1 episode)
Guillermo Díaz as Guillermo García Gómez (3 episodes)
Romany Malco as Conrad Shepard (1 episode)
Justin Chatwin as Josh Wilson (2 episodes)
Natasha Lyonne as Tiffani (2 episodes)

Former cast members 
Romany Malco returns for one episode as Conrad, who has not been seen since the season 3 finale.

Recurring cast 

Ethan and Gavin Kent as 4-year-old Stevie Ray Botwin (8 episodes)
Amanda Pace as Taylor Grey (7 episodes)
Rachel Pace as Shayla Grey (6 episodes)
Mateus Ward as 13-year-old Stevie Ray Botwin (2 episodes)
Shoshannah Stern as Megan Graves (3 episodes)
Renée Victor as Lupita (1 episode)
Maulik Pancholy as Sanjay Patel (2 episodes)
Fatso-Fasano as Marvin (2 episodes)
Kat Foster as Kiku Logan (3 episodes)
Becky Thyre as Pam (1 episode)
Meital Dohan as Yael Hoffman (1 episode)
Daryl Sabara as Tim Scottson (4 episodes)
Daniele Watts as Angela Mullen (8 episodes)
Kevin Sussman as Terry (4 episodes)
David Julian Hirsh as Rabbi Dave Bloom (7 episodes)
Andy Milder as Dean Hodes (2 episodes)
Julanne Chidi Hill as Clinique (2 episodes)
Michael Harney as Mitch Ouellette (6 episodes)
Bruce Nozick as Whit Tillerman (5 episodes)
Allyn Rachel as Monica (4 episodes)
Tammy Caplan as Spoons (4 episodes)
Price Carson as Rudy (3 episodes)
Nancy Youngblut as Beatrice (3 episodes)
Ben Tolpin as Zachary (3 episodes)
Patch Darragh as Crick Montgomery (3 episodes)
Dominic Dierkes as R.J. (3 episodes)
Craig Anton as Mark Powell (2 episodes)
Aubrey Dollar as Joanna Jacobs (2 episodes)
Jessica 'Sugar' Kiper as Simone Wiles (2 episodes)
Brady Novak as Craig (2 episodes)
Jeff Newburg as Greg (2 episodes)
Daniel Roebuck as Detective Jensen (2 episodes)
Anne Bellamy as Whimsy Ardmore (2 episodes)
Max Barakat as Matthew (2 episodes)
Aaron Zachary Philips as Jonah (2 episodes)
Calvin Sykes as Jaq (2 episodes)
Cutter Garcia as Homeless Pete (2 episodes)
Cecelia Antoinette as Homeless Mary (2 episodes)
Ryann Turner as Sage (2 episodes)
Jack Topalian as Pigeon Mike (2 episodes)
Gloria Laino as Maria (2 episodes)
Laura Harrison as Cinnamon (2 episodes)
Saverio Guerra as Jeff (2 episodes)
Clifford McGhee as Gus (2 episodes)
Michael Dempsey as Cop (2 episodes)
Jake Sandvig as Alan Spiller (2 episodes)
Mel Fair as Scott (2 episodes)
Bob Rumnock as Mr. Lippman (1 episode)
Seth Isler as Melnick (1 episode)
Eric Nenninger as Dimtri's Thug #1 (2 episodes)
Ian Reed Kesler as Dimtri's Thug #2 (2 episodes)
Jon Collin Barclay as Barton Bailey (2 episodes)
Brendan Robinson as Gordon (2 episodes)

Episodes

Production 
Showtime officially renewed Weeds for an eighth season on November 10, 2011. Creator and showrunner Jenji Kohan alongside the other series producers convened for story meetings and were informed early on in the writing process that Showtime Entertainment President David Nevins would not be renewing the show for a ninth season. "It did change how we talked about the season so far. We're building toward something different than we might have built toward had we been in the dark," commented Kohan.

For the first time since the fourth season, the show featured the Malvina Reynolds song Little Boxes as its theme music, along with a new opening title sequence. The original title sequence was briefly revived in episode 11 with the notable difference of signs reading Regrestic rather than Agrestic and Majestic. Like seasons two and three, different bands and artists were used to cover the song for each episode. Moreover, Julie Anne Robinson, who had not directed an episode since season four, directed two episodes this season. In addition, Perry Lang, who had not directed an episode since season three, directed an episode this season.

The season's first episode, "Messy", was made available online through Showtime's "Freeview" Facebook page a week before the broadcast premiere.

Reception

This season earned 60 out of 100 on Metacritic, indicating mixed reviews.

References

External links 
 
 

 
2012 American television seasons